Onor may refer to:

 Önör, vizier of the Damascus Atabegate and governor of Baalbek
 Guido Onor, a soccer player